Jaman may refer to:

Business
Jaman, company that offers users a movie discovery site

Places
Dent de Jaman, a mountain near Montreux, Switzerland
Jaman, Iran, a village in Naghan Rural District, Naghan District, Kiar County, Chaharmahal and Bakhtiari Province, Iran
Jaman District, former district that was located in the Brong Ahafo Region of Ghana
Jaman North District, district of the Brong Ahafo Region of Ghana
Jaman North (Ghana parliament constituency)
Jaman South District, district of the Brong Ahafo Region of Ghana
Jaman South (Ghana parliament constituency)

Persons
Jaman, Dutch singer
Jaman Lal Sharma (1936–2007), Indian field hockey player

See also
Gyaaman, or Jaman Kingdom, medieval African state of the Akan people, located in what is now Ghana and Côte d'Ivoire